Robert N. Armen, Jr. (born Pennsylvania, 1947) is a former Special Trial Judge of the United States Tax Court.

Career
Armen graduated from Duquesne University with a B.A. in 1969, and earned his J.D. at Georgetown University in 1973. He and went on to receive an LL.M. from Cleveland State University in 1979.

After working for the Office of Chief Counsel for the Internal Revenue Service (Cleveland District Counsel) from 1973 to 1978, Armen worked in the Criminal Tax Division from 1978 to 1979, as Washington District Counsel from 1979 to 1981, and as a law clerk to United States Tax Court Judge Howard A. Dawson, Jr. from 1981 to 1983.

He was Assistant Clerk of the Court, 1983–85, and then became Deputy Counsel to the Chief Judge, 1986–93. He was made adjunct professor at University of Baltimore Law School (Graduate Tax Program, 1988–90), and the Northern Virginia Community College (Business Division, 1981–89). Armen was appointed as a Special Trial Judge, United States Tax Court on August 27, 1993.

He retired from active service on August 31, 2019.

Note
Material on this page was copied from the website of the United States Tax Court, which is published by a United States government agency, and is therefore in the public domain.

References

1947 births
Special trial judges of the United States Tax Court
Living people
Georgetown University Law Center alumni
Duquesne University alumni
Cleveland State University alumni
University of Maryland, Baltimore faculty